Letenye is a town in Zala County, Hungary, on the border with Croatia. Across the border is the town of Goričan. Letenye was elevated to town status in 1989.

History

Transport
Letenye is the endpoint of the Hungarian M7 motorway from Budapest. The motorway crosses the Croatian-Hungarian border here and connects with the Croatian A4 motorway at Goričan.

Notable people
 Feró Nagy (1946-) - Hungarian rock singer, musician

Twin town
Letenye is twinned with:
  Prelog, Croatia

External links 

  in Hungarian

References

Populated places in Zala County
Croatia–Hungary border crossings